Miguel España Garcés (born 31 January 1964) is a Mexican former professional footballer and manager. He was a player of UNAM Pumas, and took over as coach after Hugo Sánchez stepped down as coach, and he took them to the Copa Sudamericana 2005 cup final which they lost. España also played in the 1986 FIFA World Cup.

International career
España made 81 appearances and scored two  goals for Mexico from 1984 to 1994.

Career statistics

International goals

|-
| 1. || November 11, 1984 || Port of Spain, Trinidad & Tobago ||  || 2–0 || Win || Friendly
|-
| 2. || October 6, 1987 || Toluca, Mexico ||  || 4–0 || Win || Friendly
|}

Managerial career
Currently he trains the Borregos Salvajes soccer team at the university Tecnológico de Monterrey Campus Ciudad de México.

Honours
UNAM
Mexican Primera División: 1990–91
CONCACAF Champions' Cup: 1989

Santos Laguna
Mexican Primera División: Invierno 1996

References

External links

1966 births
Living people
Footballers from Mexico City
Association football midfielders
Mexican footballers
Mexico under-20 international footballers
Mexico international footballers
1986 FIFA World Cup players
1993 Copa América players
Club Universidad Nacional footballers
Tigres UANL footballers
Santos Laguna footballers
Liga MX players
Mexican football managers
Club Universidad Nacional managers